Diogo Pereira may refer to:

 Diogo Pereira (volleyball) (born 1997), Portuguese volleyball player
 Diogo Pereira (Brazilian footballer) (born 1990), Brazilian footballer
 Diogo Pereira (Portuguese footballer) (born 1995), Portuguese footballer
 Diogo Fernandes Pereira, 16th-century Portuguese navigator